Thomas Arbuthnot (1776–1849) was a British Army commander.

Thomas Arbuthnot may also refer to:
 Thomas Arbuthnot (ship), fast sailing ship
 Thomas Arbuthnott (1911–1995), New Zealand boxer